Otto von Kotzebue (tr. ;  – ) was a Russian officer and navigator in the Imperial Russian Navy. He was born in Reval. He was known for his explorations of Oceania.

Early life and education
Born into the Kotzebue family of Brandenburgish origin, originating in Kossebau in Altmark, he was the second son of writer and diplomat August von Kotzebue and his wife, he was born in Reval (now Tallinn, Estonia), then part of the Russian Empire.  After attending the Saint Petersburg school of cadets, he accompanied Adam Johann von Krusenstern on his voyage of 1803–1806. Both attested to the prominence of Baltic Germans in Imperial Russia's naval expeditions around 1800.

Naval career 

On promotion to lieutenant, Kotzebue was placed in command of an expedition, fitted out at the expense of the imperial chancellor, Count Nikolay Rumyantsev, in the brig Rurik. In this vessel, with only twenty-seven men, including the naturalists Johann Friedrich von Eschscholtz and Adelbert von Chamisso, and the artist Louis Choris, Kotzebue set out on July 30, 1815 to find a passage across the Arctic Ocean and explore the less-known parts of Oceania.

Proceeding via Cape Horn, he discovered the Romanzov Islands (today Palliser Islands), Rurik Islands (today Tikei, and Krusenstern Islands (today Tikehau), then made for Kamchatka. In the middle of July he proceeded northward, coasting along the north-west coast of North America, and discovering and naming Kotzebue Sound or Gulf and Cape Krusenstern in the remote Chukchi Sea.

Returning by the coast of Asia, he again sailed to the south, sojourned for three weeks at the Sandwich Islands, and on January 1, 1817 discovered New Year Island.  After further cruising in the Pacific Ocean, he proceeded north. Severe illness compelled him to return to Europe, and he reached the Neva River in Russia on August 3, 1818, bringing home a large collection of previously unknown plants and new ethnological information.

In 1823 Kotzebue, now a captain, was entrusted with the command of an expedition of two ships of war, the main object of which was to take reinforcements to Kamchatka. A staff of scientists on board the Russian sailing sloop Enterprise collected much valuable information and material in geography, ethnography and natural history. The expedition, proceeding by Cape Horn, visited the Radak and Society Islands, and reached Petropavlovsk in July 1824. That same year he visited Mission Santa Clara and noted the conditions of the monjerío. Many positions along the coast were rectified, the Navigator islands visited, and several discoveries made. The expedition returned by the Marianas, Philippines, New Caledonia and the Hawaiian Islands, reaching Kronstadt on July 10, 1826.

Both of Kotzebue's narratives: A Voyage of Discovery into the South Sea and Bering’s Straits for the Purpose of exploring a North-East Passage, undertaken in the Years 1815–1818 (3 vols. 1821), and A New Voyage Round the World in the Years 1823–1826 (1830), have been translated into English.

In the last years of his life, Kotzebue lived at the Triigi Manor near Kose. He died in Reval (now Tallinn) in 1846. He was buried in the Kose churchyard approx. 30 km from Tallinn, and the gravesite is marked by an imposing monument.

Legacy and honors
Kotzebue Sound and the city of Kotzebue, Alaska are named after him. 
Kotzebue Street in the Kalamaja area of northern Tallinn in Estonia is named after him and after his father August von Kotzebue, who both lived on the street. 
The butterfly Pachliopta kotzebuea was named after him by Johann Friedrich von Eschscholtz, a botanist aboard the Rurik.

See also
 List of Baltic German explorers

References

External links
 
 
 
 Overview of Triigi (Kau) manor (owned by the von Kotzebue's) in Estonian Manors Portal
 genealogy of the family Kotzebue

19th-century explorers
19th-century German people
1787 births
1846 deaths
Adelbert von Chamisso
Baltic-German people
Explorers of Alaska
German explorers of North America
Explorers from the Russian Empire
Johann Friedrich von Eschscholtz
People from Tallinn
People from the Governorate of Estonia
People of Russian America
Russian and Soviet polar explorers
Russian explorers of the Pacific